As One may refer to:

People
 Kirk Degiorgio, British techno producer and DJ

Entertainment
 As One (opera), a 2014 opera composed by Laura Kaminsky
 As One (film), a 2012 film

Music
 As One (musical duo), a South Korean musical duo
 As One (Hong Kong band), a cantopop girl group in Hong Kong
 As One (Richard Davis album), 1976
 As One (The Bar Kays album), 1980
 As One (Kool & the Gang album), 1982
 As One (Jane Ira Bloom and Fred Hersch album), 1985
 As One (Toshinobu Kubota album), 2000
 As One, an album by Double Trouble, 1990
 "As One" (Suede song), a song by Suede on their 2018 album The Blue Hour
 "As One" (Tarot song), 1995